Dorothy Katherine Standing, Lady Clements (18 February 1909 – 4 May 1980), known professionally as Kay Hammond, was an English stage and film actress.

Family
Kay Hammond was born in London, England as Dorothy Katherine Standing, the daughter of Sir Guy Standing and his wife, Dorothy Hammond (Dorothy Plaskitt). Her grandfather was Herbert Standing (1846–1923) and her uncles were Wyndham, Percy and Jack Standing, as well as Herbert Standing Jr., father of Joan Standing.

Career
She studied at RADA and first appeared on the London stage in 1927. Her most famous role was that of Elvira in Noël Coward's Blithe Spirit, which she played in the original stage production. She reprised her role in the 1945 film version opposite Rex Harrison, Margaret Rutherford and Constance Cummings.

She appeared as a guest of Roy Plomley on Desert Island Discs on 25 February 1951.

Personal life

Hammond's first husband was baronet Sir Ronald George Leon. Their sons were John Ronald Leon (the actor John Standing) and Timothy George Leon. Her second husband was the stage actor Sir John Clements.

Death
Kay Hammond died in Brighton, aged 71, from undisclosed causes, on 4 May 1980. She was cremated and her ashes scattered in the memorial garden at Downs Crematorium, Brighton, East Sussex

Filmography

Selected stage credits
 Can the Leopard...? by Ronald Jeans (1931)
 Hollywood Holiday by John Van Druten (1931)

References

 Halliwell's Who's Who in the Movies - John Walker (editor), 14th edition, 2001,

External links
 
 
 Cine Morgue
 sultry portrait

1909 births
1980 deaths
English film actresses
English stage actresses
Actresses from London
20th-century English actresses
Alumni of RADA
Standing family
Wives of knights